Lakitelek is a large village in Bács-Kiskun county, in the Southern Great Plain region of southern Hungary.

Geography
It is 120 km from Budapest and 27 km from Kecskemét, only 3 km from the river of Tisza. Due to the nature of a transport hub, it is easily accessible from several directions- either on the main road M44 or by rail on the MÁV No. 146 Kecskemét – Kunszentmárton and No. 145 Szolnok – Kiskunfélegyháza railway side lines. The two railway lines intersect in Lakitelek.

History
Its present area was formed in 1949-50 by uniting the steppes belonging to Kecskemét. These outlying settlements were: Felsőalpár, Kisalpár, Oncsa settlement, Árpádszállás, Szikra, Kapásfalu. The town has a strong historical past, as its geographical location is such that that people ages before the written memories are welcome settled in this region. The earliest archaeological finds are from the Copper Age, from the peoples of the Bodrogkeresztúr culture, following them say that the BC III. people have been living here since the turn of the millennium.

References

External links

  in Hungarian

Populated places in Bács-Kiskun County